Johan Ghoos (born 22 June 1956) is a Belgian rower. He competed in the men's coxless four event at the 1976 Summer Olympics.

References

1956 births
Living people
Belgian male rowers
Olympic rowers of Belgium
Rowers at the 1976 Summer Olympics
Place of birth missing (living people)